Springfest is a common name for events occurring to celebrate the coming of Spring.
Spring Fest, popularly known as SF, is the annual social & cultural festival held at Indian Institute of Technology, Kharagpur, India during the month of January in the spring semester.
Springfest is a common name for The Florida SpringFest, a musical event in downtown Pensacola, Florida.
Springfest is a one- or two-day annual gathering at the European School of Brussels 3.  Students, parents and teachers show off their talents or hobbies.  Events include a fashion show, a battle of the bands, management seminars and football.
Springfest is an annual celebration held the first weekend of May in Ocean City, Maryland.  The festival includes local foods, a craft market, and local and national musical artists.
Springfest is an annual block party held in student housing complexes in Harrisonburg, Virginia. A violent response to police broke out during the 2010 Springfest block party, known as the Springfest Riot.
Springfest is an annual festival held since 2001 in Ballarat, Victoria Australia between August and November. The festival includes a weekend market and music festival.
Springfest is an annual festival In Lubbock Texas, that many of the natives to Lubbock and around there attend to. There is an abundance of alcohol, and drunks.